D'Angelo Bluff is a prominent north-facing rock bluff,  long, trending westward from Mount McIntyre. It was discovered by the Byrd Antarctic Expedition geological party led by Quin Blackburn, in December 1934. The bluff was visited on December 5, 1962, by a geological party of the Ohio State University Institute of Polar Studies, led by George Doumani, and was named by him for CWO John D'Angelo, US Army, a helicopter pilot who landed the party on this bluff.

References 

Cliffs of the Ross Dependency
Amundsen Coast